Antony Mars (22 October 1861 – 17 February 1915) was a French playwright

Biography 
After he studied at a high school in Marseille, Antony March became a lawyer's clerk then an employee at the Compagnie des chemins de fer de l'Est. En 1882, he collaborated with several newspapers: La Cocarde, Le Mot d'ordre, Le Réveil (1882-1884).

A friend of Paul Morisse and Raymond Bonheur, he made his debut in theatre in Le Havre in 1885 with Les Droits de la femme. He obtained many successes in his time but today his most famous play remains Les Surprises du divorce written in 1888 with Alexandre Bisson.

Works 
He left a great number of plays, staged on the most famous Parisian venues: Théâtre des Bouffes-Parisiens, Théâtre de la Renaissance, Théâtre de Cluny, théâtre du Palais-Royal, théâtre du Gymnase or else Théâtre des Folies-Dramatiques, often presented again in the 1910s-1950s.

1885: Un enlèvement, monologue comique
1887: Quand on conspire !, opérette bouffe in 1 act
1887: Tête folle, comédie en vaudevilles in 2 acts with distincts and music
1888: Les Deux Pigeons, play in 2 acts, with songs and music, for young girls
1888: Veuve Durosel ! ..., comedy in 1 act
1889: La Meunière du Moulin-joli, play in 2 acts, with chorus and distincts
1889: Les Maris sans femmes, comedy in 3 acts
1889: Le Secret des Pardhaillan, folie-vaudeville in 1 act
1889: Les Surprises du divorce, comedy in 3 acts, with Alexandre Bisson
1890: À la salle de police, saynète
1890: Les Douze Femmes de Japhet, vaudeville opérette in three acts
1890: Un monsieur qui dîne en ville, comedy in 1 act
1890: Les Vieux Maris, comédie en vaudevilles in 3 acts
1891: La Demoiselle du téléphone
1891: Le Mitron 
1892: Les Vingt-huit Jours de Clairette, vaudeville-operetta in 4 acts
1892: La Bonne de chez Duval
1892: 3, rue de la Pompe
1893: L'Homme à l'oreille cassée
1893: Un conte bleu, operetta in 3 acts
1894: Barbotin et Picquoiseau, comédie en vaudevilles in two acts
1894: Monsieur Gavroche, comédie en vaudevilles in two acts with chorus and distincts
1895: La Dot de Brigitte, operetta in 3 acts
1896: Le Voyage de Corbillon
1896: L'Hôtel du lac, vaudeville in two acts
1896: Le Mari d'Hortense, comedy in 1 act
1896: Rose et Blanche, comedy in two acts, with chorus and distincts
1896: Sa majesté l'amour, operetta with extravaganza in 3 acts
1896: Le Truc de Séraphin, comedy in three acts, with Maurice Desvallières
1897: Les Fêtards, operetta in 3 acts, with Maurice Hennequin
1897: La Succession Beaugaillard, comédie en vaudevilles in three acts
1898: Le Docteur Oscar, comédie en vaudevilles in 1 act
1899: La Mouche 
1899: La Poule blanche 
1899: La Meunière du Moulin-joli, comedy in 2 acts, with chorus and distincts
1901: Le Billet de logement, comédie en vaudevilles in 3 acts
1902: La Petite Cendrillon, operetta in 2 acts
1903: La Marmotte
1906: Le Fils à papa, comédie en vaudevilles in 3 acts, with Maurice Desvallières
1909: La Revanche d'Ève
1911: Madame l'Amirale 
1911: La Roue de la fortune, comédie en vaudevilles in 2 acts
1911: Mon ami Chose !..., comédie en vaudevilles in 1 act, for young men
1912: Son Altesse, comédie en vaudevilles in 2 acts
1913: La Chaste Suzanne, operetta in 3 acts (a French version of Die keusche Susanne which is based on Le Fils à papa, 1906)
1923: La Mort d'Arthème Lapin, drame parodique (mélimélodrama) in 1 act

Filmography
, directed by Georges Monca and Charles Prince (France, 1912, short film, based on Les Surprises du divorce)
Le Fils à papa, directed by Georges Monca and Charles Prince (France, 1913, short film, based on Le Fils à papa)
Le Voyage de Corbillon, directed by Georges Monca and Charles Prince (France, 1914, short film, based on Le Voyage de Corbillon)
I mariti allegri, directed by Camillo De Riso (Italy, 1914, short film, based on Les Maris sans femmes)
L'ammiraglia, directed by Nino Oxilia (Italy, 1914, short film, based on Madame l'Amirale)
The Girl in the Taxi, directed by Lloyd Ingraham (1921, based on Le Fils à papa)
, directed by Guido Brignone (Italy, 1923, based on Les Surprises du divorce)
Chaste Susanne, directed by Richard Eichberg (Germany, 1926, based on Le Fils à papa)
I 28 giorni di Claretta, directed by Eugenio Perego (Italy, 1927, based on Les Vingt-huit Jours de Clairette)
Billeting Order, directed by Charles-Félix Tavano (France, 1932, based on Le Billet de logement)
, directed by Jean Kemm (France, 1933, based on Les Surprises du divorce)
, directed by André Hugon (France, 1933, based on Les Vingt-huit Jours de Clairette)
, directed by André Berthomieu (France, 1937, based on Le Fils à papa)
The Girl in the Taxi, directed by André Berthomieu (UK, 1937, based on Le Fils à papa)
, directed by Guido Brignone (Italy, 1939, based on Les Surprises du divorce)
La Casta Susana, directed by Benito Perojo (Argentina, 1944, based on Le Fils à papa)
, directed by Luis César Amadori (Spain, 1963, based on Le Fils à papa)

References

Bibliography 
 Hugo P. Thieme, Guide bibliographique de la littérature française de 1800 à 1906, 1907
 Grand Larousse encyclopédique en dix volumes, 1963, p. 121
 Kurt Gänzl, The Encyclopedia of the Musical Theatre, vol.2, 2001, p. 13

External links 
 Antony Mars on data.bnf.fr
 

19th-century French dramatists and playwrights
20th-century French dramatists and playwrights
French male dramatists and playwrights
People from Alpes-Maritimes
1861 births
1915 deaths